Sir James Cantlie  (17 January 1851 – 28 May 1926) was a British physician. He was a pioneer of first aid, which in 1875 was unknown: even the police had no knowledge of basic techniques such as how to stop serious bleeding and applying splints.  He was also influential in the study of tropical diseases and in the debates concerning degeneration theory.

Cantlie was born in Banffshire and took his first degree at Aberdeen University, carrying out his clinical training at Charing Cross Hospital, London. 

In 1877, Cantlie became a Fellow of the Royal College of Surgeons and Assistant Surgeon to Charing Cross Hospital; in 1886 he became Surgeon at Charing Cross. In 1888, he resigned to take up a position in Hong Kong. While in the crown colony, he co-founded the Hong Kong College of Medicine for Chinese, which later grew into the University of Hong Kong. One of his first pupils at the College was the future Chinese leader Dr Sun Yat-sen. Cantlie's work in Hong Kong included investigations into leprosy and into various tropical diseases; in 1894 he encountered an outbreak of plague.

In 1896, poor health – related to his unstinting work as a researcher and practicing physician – forced Cantlie to return to London.  Later that year, Dr Sun visited him, and was kidnapped by the Imperial Chinese secret service. 

Sun was tied up in the Chinese Legation, and might well have been shipped back to China and executed had it not been for Cantlie, who led a media campaign which not only succeeded in releasing Dr Sun, but made him a hero in Britain. 

Cantlie was involved in the setting up of the Journal of Tropical Medicine in 1898, and the founding of the London School of Tropical Medicine in 1899.  He was a founder in 1907 of the Royal Society of Tropical Medicine and Hygiene. During the early years of the twentieth century, and particularly during the First World War (1914–1919), Cantlie's work centred on the provision and training of ambulance services.

On his death he was buried in St John the Baptist church, Cottered, Herts.

He is the father of Lieutenant Colonel Kenneth Cantlie, as well as great grandfather of John Cantlie.

See also
 Cantlie line

References

 Mark Harrison, "Cantlie, Sir James (1851–1926)", Oxford Dictionary of National Biography. September 2004 .
Choa, G. H. (2000) The Life and Times of Sir Kai Ho, Chinese University Press, 
China Rhyming blog The Man Who Rescued Sun Yat-sen – The Memorial to Sir James Cantile at Cottered
Books by Paul French
RAS China Monographs
Zed Asian Arguments
“History doesn’t repeat itself, but it does rhyme.”
— Mark Twain
The Man Who Rescued Sun Yat-sen – The Memorial to Sir James Cantile at Cottered

External links
 

1851 births
1926 deaths
Alumni of the University of Aberdeen
Fellows of the Royal College of Surgeons
19th-century Scottish medical doctors
20th-century Scottish medical doctors
Knights Commander of the Order of the British Empire
Sun Yat-sen
Presidents of the Royal Society of Tropical Medicine and Hygiene